Bright Ideas is Portastatic's fifth studio album. It was released on Merge Records on August 23, 2005 

The album was the first Portastatic album that was completely recorded in a modern studio. Previous albums were either partially or completely recorded on a Portastudio 4-track recorder. The album was recorded at Tiny Telephone Studio in San Francisco, California and engineered by Tim Mooney.

Track listing 
 "Bright Ideas"
 "Through With People"
 "White Wave"
 "I Wanna Know Girls"
 "Little Fern"
 "Truckstop Cassettes"
 "The Soft Rewind"
 "Registered Ghost"
 "Center of the World"
 "Full of Stars"

Notes 

2003 albums
Portastatic albums
Merge Records albums